Jett Blaschka (born September 16, 1999) is a United States Virgin Islands international footballer who plays for Manchester 62 of the Gibraltar Football League, and the United States Virgin Islands national team.

Youth career 
Prior to moving to USVI, Blaschka played for the youth academy of Milwaukee Bavarian SC. As a high school freshman he played for the Good Hope Country Day School in Saint Croix. Half way through his freshman year he attended Montverde Academy in Montverde, Florida where he was a three sport varsity athlete in soccer, cross country and track.  He helped lead the soccer team to three-straight unbeaten seasons (32-0-5) en route to three-straight national championships.

College career 
Blaschka was recruited Marquette University in 2018 to play for their Golden Eagles soccer team. He earned Big East all academic team and redshirted his freshman year.

Club career
For the 2019 season, Blaschka joined the Treasure Coast Tritons of the USL League 2. However he did not make any appearances for the club during that year.  In August 2021 it was announced that Blaschka signed for Pittsburgh City United FC of the United Premier Soccer League, the fourth tier of the United States soccer league system for the 2021 season. He was joined at the club by USVI national teammates Ramesses McGuiness and Dante Nicholas. Blaschka was tied for second on the team with five goals and finished first on the team with six assists n 12 matches and won team MVP. For his performances he was named UPSL Northeast team of the week 3 times in twelve matches which put him in a two way tie for most in all of UPSL Northeast.

In July 2022 it was announced that Blaschka had made the move to Europe, signing for Manchester 62 of the Gibraltar National League.

International career
Blaschka moved to the United States Virgin Islands from Wisconsin at age 9. At the age of 13 he captained the island's under-15 national team. In 2014 he again captained the team at age 14 during 2015 CONCACAF U-17 Championship qualifying. He made his senior international debut on October 12, 2018 in a 2019–20 CONCACAF Nations League qualifying match against Curaçao.

Statistics

References

External links
 
 
 
 

1999 births
Living people
Soccer players from Florida
Soccer players from Wisconsin
United States Virgin Islands soccer players
United States Virgin Islands international soccer players
Association football midfielders
Marquette Golden Eagles men's soccer players
Sportspeople from Racine, Wisconsin